Fibroporia albicans is a species of poroid crust fungus in the family Fomitopsidaceae. It causes a brown rot. The fungus was described in 2015 as a species new to science, based on collections made in Jiangxi and Xizang Provinces, China. It is one of five Fibroporia species recorded in China.

Description
Fibroporia albicans is characterized by crust-like, annual fruit bodies with a white to cream-colored fresh pore surface that darkens to cream or cream-buff after drying. The pores are small, measuring 6–8 per millimeter, and there are white to cream rhizomorphs. Fibroporia albicans has a dimitic hyphal system with clamped generative hyphae, fuse-shaped cystidioles, and oblong to ellipsoid spores that measure 4–5.2 by 3–3.8 μm.

References

Fomitopsidaceae
Fungi described in 2015
Fungi of China
Taxa named by Bao-Kai Cui